Les Voix intérieures is a collection of poems by Victor Hugo published in 1837.

Poetry by Victor Hugo
1837 books
French poetry collections